Jacek Sauk (born 21 July 1944 in Vilnius) is a Polish politician, member of Law and Justice party. He was a member of Polish Sejm from 2001 to 2005 and Polish Senate from 1997 to 2001 and from 2005 to 2007.

References

1944 births
Living people
Politicians from Vilnius
Law and Justice politicians
Members of the Senate of Poland 1997–2001
Members of the Polish Sejm 2001–2005
Members of the Senate of Poland 2005–2007